Magdalena Cecilia Colledge (28 November 1920 – 12 April 2008) was a British figure skater. She was the 1936 Olympic silver medalist, the 1937 World Champion, the 1937–1939 European Champion, and a six-time (1935–1939, 1946) British national champion.

Colledge is credited as being the first female skater to perform a double jump, as well as being the inventor of both the camel spin and the layback spin.

Personal life
Cecilia Colledge grew up in London. Her father, Lionel, was a surgeon researching the treatment of throat cancer, and her mother, Margaret, the daughter of Admiral John Brackenbury. She had one sibling, a brother named Maule who served in the Royal Air Force and died during World War II.

Colledge never married and had no children. She died on 12 April 2008 at Mount Auburn Hospital in Cambridge, Massachusetts.

Career 
Colledge began skating after watching the 1928 World Championships, which were held in London. Her mother, Margaret, had been invited by the mother of Maribel Vinson. At the event, Cecilia was inspired by the performances of Sonja Henie and Maribel Vinson, who won gold and silver respectively.

During her career, Colledge was coached by Eva Keats and Jacques Gerschwiler. At age eleven years and four months, she represented Great Britain at the 1932 Winter Olympics, where she became the youngest Olympic figure skater. She placed 8th in the event.

She won the silver medal at the 1933 European Championships. She won her first British national title in 1935. She won the bronze medal at the 1935 European Championships and the silver medal at the 1935 World Championships.

In 1936, she won her second national title and her second Europeans silver medal. At the 1936 European Championships, Colledge landed a double salchow jump, becoming the first woman to perform a double jump in competition. At age fifteen, she represented Great Britain at the 1936 Winter Olympics, where she won the silver medal behind Henie, finishing a very close second to her, became one of the youngest figure skating Olympic medalists. After the school figures section, Colledge and Henie were virtually neck and neck with Colledge trailing by just a few points. According to Sandra Stevenson in The Independent on 21 April 2008, "the closeness [of the competition] infuriated Henie, who, when the result for that section was posted on a wall in the competitors' lounge, swiped the piece of paper and tore it into little pieces. The draw for the free skating [then] came under suspicion after Henie landed the plum position of skating last, while Colledge had to perform second of the 26 competitors. The early start was seen as a disadvantage, with the audience not yet whipped into a clapping frenzy and the judges known to become freer with their higher marks as the event proceeded. Years later, a fairer, staggered draw was adopted to counteract this situation".

There were two British Championships held in 1937 and Colledge won both of them. She won her first European title at the 1937 European Championships and her first World title at the 1937 World Championships. The following year, Colledge won a fifth national title, a second European title, and won the silver medal at the 1938 World Championships. Writing in 1938, T. D. Richardson (author of Modern Figure Skating and Ice Rink Skating) said "Her Free Skating Programme is by far the most difficult attempted by anyone, man or woman, in the Skating World, but she brings off these staggeringly difficult combinations of jumps and spins with such ease and sureness and at such speed that even experts are sometimes deceived as to the real worth of her programme."

In 1939, she won a third European title, but was unable to compete at the 1939 World Championships because of a strained achilles tendon.

During World War II, there were no skating competitions. Colledge drove an ambulance in the Motor Transport Corps during the London Blitz. Following the war, she returned to competitive skating and won the British national title for the sixth and final time. After she turned professional, she won the 1947 and 1948 Open Professional Championship.

She moved to the United States in 1951 and became a coach in Boston. She coached at the Skating Club of Boston between 1952 and 1977. Among her students were Albertina Noyes, Paul McGrath, and Ron Ludington.

She was inducted into the World Figure Skating Hall of Fame in 1980.

Innovations
At the 1936 European Championships, Colledge became the first female skater to land a two rotation jump in competition when she landed a double salchow.

She is credited as being the inventor of the camel spin along with its catchfoot variation and the layback spin. Although not named after her, she was one of the first skaters who transitioned from a layback spin to a one hand Biellmann spin in her free programmes.

She also invented the one-foot Axel jump, which is also known as the Colledge.

Competitive highlights

References

Further reading

 E.R. Hall & T.D. Richardson – Champions all: camera studies by E.R. Hall (Frederick Muller, 1938)
 Richardson T.D – Modern Figure Skating (Methuen, 1938)

1920 births
2008 deaths
British female single skaters
English female single skaters
Olympic figure skaters of Great Britain
Figure skaters at the 1936 Winter Olympics
Figure skaters at the 1932 Winter Olympics
Olympic silver medallists for Great Britain
British figure skating coaches
Olympic medalists in figure skating
World Figure Skating Championships medalists
European Figure Skating Championships medalists
English Olympic medallists
Medalists at the 1936 Winter Olympics
Sportspeople from London
Female sports coaches